Edward or Eddie Jordan may refer to:
 Edward Jordan (pirate) (1771–1809), Irish rebel, fisherman and pirate in Nova Scotia
 Edward S. Jordan (1882–1958), American entrepreneur, automotive industrialist and pioneer in evocative advertising copy
 Edward Jordan (American lawyer) (1820–1899), Solicitor of the United States Treasury
 Kidd Jordan (Edward Jordan, born 1935), American jazz saxophonist
 Eddie Jordan (born 1948), founder of defunct Formula One team, Jordan Grand Prix
 Eddie Jordan (basketball) (born 1955), retired basketball player and coach
 Eddie Jordan (attorney) (born 1952), former district attorney for Orleans Parish (including the city of New Orleans), Louisiana
 Eddie Jordan, keyboard player for the band Fiction Factory
 Eddie Jack Jordan (artist) (1925–1999), African American artist

See also 

 Edward Jordon (1800–1869), Jamaican activist and mayor